Ali ibn Husayn Zayn al-Abidin or Zayn al-Abidin (659–713) was an imam in Shiʻi Islam, and great-grandson of the prophet Muhammad.

Zayn al-Abidin may also refer to:
 Zainul Abidin (politician) (born 1948), Singaporean diplomat, politician and journalist
 Zainul Abidin of Aceh (died 1579), sultan of Aceh in northern Sumatra
 Zainul Abedin (1914–1976), Bangladeshi painter
 Zainul Abedin (politician) (–2014), Bangladeshi politician